Federal Route 138 is a federal road in Malacca, Malaysia, connecting Masjid Tanah and Kuala Linggi.  It was originally known as Jalan Kuala Sungai Baru-Sungai Udang (Melaka State Route M143 on Kuala Linggi - Kuala Sungai Baru side) and Jalan Lubuk Redan-Masjid Tanah (Melaka State Route M142). Federal Route  features Sungai Linggi Bridge and was built to provide a shorter, less-winding alternative to Federal Route 5 for journeys from Malacca City to Port Dickson. Kilometre Zero of Federal Route 138 is at Kampung Jeram near Masjid Tanah.

Features

Notable features
Shortcut routes to Port Dickson from Malacca City.
Kolej Universiti Islam Melaka (KUIM)
Akademi Laut Malaysia (ALAM) (Malaysian Maritime Academy)
Sungai Linggi Bridge - A box girder bridge near Dutch Kuala Linggi Fort officially opened on 10 July 1990 by fourth Malaysian Prime Minister, Mahathir Mohamad.

At most sections, the Federal Route 138 was built under the JKR R5 road standard, allowing maximum speed limit of up to 90 km/h.

Overlaps
Kuala Linggi - Kuala Sungai Baru:  Jalan Kuala Sungai Baru-Sungai Udang

Alternate routes
None

Sections with motorcycle lanes
None

List of junctions

References

Malaysian Federal Roads